General Dawnay may refer to:

David Dawnay (1903–1971), British Army major general
Guy Dawnay (British Army officer) (1878–1952), British Army major general
Hugh Dawnay, 8th Viscount Downe (1844–1924), British Army major general